Leuba may refer to:

Geography 
 Leuba (Ostritz), a district of Ostritz
 Leuba (river), a river in Thuringia

People with the surname 
 James H. Leuba (1867–1946), American psychologist
 Jean-François Leuba (1934–2004), Swiss lawyer and jurist

See also 
 Gottleuba